PureTech Health is a biotechnology company which develops medicines to combat serious diseases. It is listed on the London Stock Exchange and is a constituent of the FTSE 250 Index.

History
The company was founded by Daphne Zohar, an American entrepreneur, in 2005. It was the subject of an initial public offering on the London Stock Exchange in June 2015.

Operations
Companies which PureTech Health founded include Karuna Pharmaceuticals, Gelesis, which has received FDA approval as a treatment for weight management, Akili Interactive Labs, which is developing a digital therapeutic platform for cognitive disorders, Vedanta Biosciences, which is developing drugs to treat autoimmune and inflammatory diseases, and Follica which is developing new treatments for androgentic alopecia among others. PureTech also has a pipeline of its own immunology, lymphatic and oncology based therapeutics.

References

External links

Health care companies of the United Kingdom
Health care companies established in 2001
2001 establishments in the United Kingdom
Companies listed on the London Stock Exchange